The Cabinet Secretary is the top-most executive official and senior-most civil servant of the Government of India. The Cabinet Secretary is the ex-officio head of the Civil Services Board, the Cabinet Secretariat, the Indian Administrative Service (IAS), and all Civil Services of India work under the rules of business of the government.

The Cabinet Secretary is the senior-most cadre post of the Indian Administrative Service, ranking eleventh on the Indian order of precedence. The Cabinet Secretary is under the direct charge of the Prime Minister. Since 2010, the Cabinet Secretary's term length was extended to a maximum of four years.

History

Origin 
The precursor to the cabinet, the Executive Council of the Viceroy, used to have a Secretariat, which was headed by the Private Secretary of the Viceroy. At first, the role of this Secretariat was merely to take care of the paperwork related to the Executive Council but when the work of the individual departments under the Council increased, the work of the Secretariat too became more complex. The Private Secretary came to be known as the secretary of the secretariat. And this post became more powerful over time as the Secretariat's main role became coordinating the work of the departments. In 1946, the secretariat became cabinet secretariat and the secretary became the Cabinet Secretary.

After Independence in 1947, the functions of the Secretariat underwent major changes. Being the seniormost secretary, he doesn't belong to any ministry. A series of committees on economic, defence and intelligence matters was constituted under the Cabinet Secretariat. Most of the departments created after Independence functioned under the Cabinet Secretariat and were later seconded to the respective ministries. The position holder is accountable for ensuring that the civil service is equipped with the skills and capability to meet the everyday challenges it faces and that the civil servants work in a fair and decent environment.

Functions and power
The following are the functions of the Cabinet Secretary:
 Heads the Cabinet Secretariat.
 Acts as the chief coordinator of the central government.
 Acts as the chairman of the Civil Services Board, which among other things, recommends empanelment of officers (except officers under the Ministry of External Affairs), for the ranks of secretary, additional secretary and joint secretary.
 Act as the chairman of the Committee of Secretaries on Administration.
 Act as the chairman of the Conference of Chief Secretaries of States.
 Recommends postings of officers (except officers under the Ministry of External Affairs) of the rank of secretary and additional Secretary to the Appointments Committee of the Cabinet (ACC).
 Acts as the chairman of Senior Selection Board, which recommends postings of officers of the rank of joint secretary in the Union Government to the Appointments Committee of the Cabinet (ACC).
 Acts as a senior adviser to the Prime Minister.
 Provide assistance to the Council of Ministers.
 Prepares the agenda of the cabinet and minutes its meetings.
 Provide an element of continuity and stability to administration during crises.

Role 

In the Government of India Allocation of Business Rules, 1961, the Cabinet Secretariat finds a place in the First Schedule to the Rules. The subjects allotted to this Secretariat are, firstly, secretarial assistance to Cabinet and Cabinet Committees, and secondly, the Administration of the Rules of Business.

The Cabinet Secretariat is responsible for the administration of the Transaction of Business Rules, 1961 and the Allocation of Business Rules, 1961 of the Government of India, facilitating smooth transaction of business in ministries/departments of the Government by ensuring adherence to these rules. The Secretariat assists in decision-making in Government by ensuring Inter-Ministerial coordination, ironing out differences amongst ministries/departments and evolving consensus through the instrumentality of the standing/ad hoc Committees of Secretaries. Through this mechanism, new policy initiatives are also promoted.

The Cabinet Secretariat ensures that the President of India, the Vice-President and Ministers are kept informed of the major activities of all departments by means of a monthly summary of their activities. Management of major crisis situations in the country and coordinating activities of the various ministries in such a situation is also one of the functions of the Cabinet Secretariat.

The Cabinet Secretariat comprises three wings: Civil, Military and Intelligence. The Civil wing is considered to be the main wing and provides aid, advice and assistance to the Union Cabinet. The purpose of having the Military wing is to have better coordination in Intelligence and to provide secretarial assistance to the Defence Committee of the Cabinet and the National Defence Council. The Military wing is represented by an officer of the rank of major general, or its equivalents in the Indian Armed Forces, who is designated as a joint secretary in the Cabinet Secretariat. The Intelligence wing deals with matters pertaining to the Joint Intelligence Committee of the union cabinet. The chief of the Research and Analysis Wing (R&AW) also officially first reports to the Cabinet Secretary, and is designated Secretary (R) in the Cabinet Secretariat.

The First Administrative Reforms Commission (1966–70) found that the average tenure of the Cabinet Secretary was two years and eight months, which was considered to be inadequate. It recommended a tenure of three to four years. It also wanted that Cabinet Secretary to act as the principal staff officer to the prime minister, the cabinet and the cabinet committees for important matters.

Head of the All India Civil Services

As head of the Civil Services, the incumbent position holder is accountable for ensuring that the civil services are equipped with the skills and capability to meet the everyday challenges it faces and that civil servants work in a fair and decent environment. The Cabinet Secretary is arguably India's most powerful bureaucrat and the right hand of the Prime Minister of India.

Emolument, accommodation and perquisites 
The Cabinet Secretary to Government of India is eligible for a diplomatic passport. The official earmarked residence of the Cabinet Secretary is 32, Prithviraj Road, New Delhi, a Type-VIII bungalow.

The salary and emolument in this rank is in pay level 18 which is equivalent to Chief of the Army Staff, but in precedence the cabinet secretary is listed above all other government officers including those from armed forces. It is however a fact, that the warrant of precedence is not an indication of functional or inter-se seniority, and is only referred to for seating at official functions, with no relevance to the day to day business of government.

List of Cabinet Secretaries of India 
In 1950, N. R. Pillai, ICS was appointed as the first cabinet secretary.

See also 
 Defence Secretary (India)
 Foreign Secretary (India)
 Home Secretary (India)
Chief secretary (India)
Principal Secretary to PM
National Security Advisor (India)

Notes

References

External links
Cabinet Secretariat — Government of India
Official portal of the Government of India
Union Public Service Commission

Civil Services of India
Indian government officials
Indian Administrative Service officers